Alguaire is a municipality in the comarca of the Segrià in Catalonia. A portion of its municipal limits are occupied by the Lleida-Alguaire Airport.

Demography

References

External links 

Official website
 Government data pages 

Municipalities in Segrià
Populated places in Segrià